Kurtköy is a neighborhood of Pendik district of Istanbul.

Previously, it was a district of Kartal. After Pendik became a district, it became a neighborhood of this district. It was established on Aydos Mountain, located in the northwest of Kurtköy. It has famous places like Istanbul Sabiha Gökçen International Airport, Viaport. Kurtköy is also counted in the urban sub-division, which includes the neighborhoods of Kurtköy, Yenişehir, Çamlık, Sanayi, Şeyhli, Sülüntepe, Harmandere and the villages of Kurna, Emirli, Ballıca, Kurtdoğmuş, Göçbeyli, Akfırat and Tepeören.

History of Kurtköy 
The Turkmens, who came to settle in the 1400s by the Ottoman Sultan Mehmed the Conqueror, formed the present-day Pendik neighbourhoods.

Kurtköy in Sports 
Kurtköy has a sports team that plays in Turkey. The name of the team is Kurtköyspor. He became the champion in the 2021-22 U-16 League in football in Turkey and the team was founded in 1992.

Schools 
Kurtköy High School

References

External links
 Information About Kurtköy in Pendik Municipality (in Turkish)

Geography of Istanbul
Neighbourhoods of Pendik